The Guardian is a 2006 American action-adventure drama film directed by Andrew Davis. The film stars Kevin Costner, Ashton Kutcher and Melissa Sagemiller. The title of the film refers to a legendary figure within the film which protects people lost at sea: "the Guardian". The film focuses on the United States Coast Guard and their Aviation Survival Technician program. The Guardian was released on September 29, 2006.

It is also loosely based on the Japanese film Umizaru (2004).

Plot
The film opens with a description of a legend told by people who have survived being lost at sea: a presence, referred to as the Guardian, which pushed them to the surface, enabling them to survive until help arrived.

Ben Randall is the top rescue swimmer at the United States Coast Guard's Aviation Survival Technician (AST) program, but the long hours have destroyed his marriage. When on a rescue, Ben loses his team in a HH-60J Jayhawk helicopter crash at sea. While waiting in a survival raft, his best friend, Chief Petty Officer Carl Billings dies. Shaken by survivor guilt, Ben is transferred to become an instructor at the Coast Guard AST training school. He develops a legendary reputation among the students for his high number of rescues.

Jake Fischer is a hot-shot candidate for AST. Ranked as a top high school competitive swimmer with scholarships to every Ivy League college, Jake instead opts to enlist in the Coast Guard. During training, Jake meets local schoolteacher, Emily Thomas, and they begin a casual relationship.

The initial weeks of training end with most of the students dropping out and advanced instruction begins. Jake is late for class and Ben punishes his entire class for his tardiness. Believing Jake to be lazy and unmotivated, Ben tries to force him to quit. He gradually begins to see Jake's persistence and dedication.

Jake meets Emily in a bar and tells her about beating Ben's old records. The bartender, a friend of Ben's, tells Jake about a time when Ben injured himself saving every victim from a burning hospital ship full of invalid patients.

Later, a friend of Jake's is afraid of failing school because he is unable to cope with panicked victims in the water. Jake takes him out for a drink at a Navy bar to cheer him up. They get in a fight and land in jail after being badly beaten by the Navy sailors, causing Jake to miss a date with Emily. Jake returns to base and takes the blame for the fight.

Chief Aviation Survival Technician Jack Skinner bails Jake out. Back on base, Ben and Jake get into a confrontation about their pasts. It is revealed that during high school, Jake was involved in a car crash while on the way home with his teammates. It is revealed Jake lost the flip to be the designated driver and, although completely sober, blames himself for the accident. The two bond over the common experience of being the only survivor of fatal accidents. They return to the bar and fight the sailors again, this time winning.

At graduation, only a handful of candidates remain. Jake has emerged as a leader during training. Emily attends his graduation, but they end their relationship because Jake is leaving for an assignment at CG Air Station Kodiak, Alaska, Ben's previous post.

Ben and Jake are sent to rescue two kayakers trapped in a cave. Ben experiences flashbacks and Jake must guide him, but the rescue is eventually successful. Ben decides to retire after this. He tells Jake that the only record he kept track of was the 22 people he lost during his career. Ben apologizes to his wife and indicates he will not contest the divorce.

Jake is sent to rescue the crew of a sinking fishing trawler. During the rescue, he becomes trapped in the ship. His helicopter is forced to return to base, where Ben hears of the situation and decides to suit up and go out to rescue Jake personally. He frees Jake from the hull. As they are winched upwards towards the helicopter, their combined weight causes the winch cable to begin separating. Knowing that the cable will break, Ben unclips himself so that Jake can survive. Jake catches him, but Ben removes his glove and slips free, plummeting into the ocean. His body is never found.

Much later, Jake is on a rescue mission, when one of the survivors repeats the legend of the Guardian to him. Jake connects the legend to Ben. He then surprises Emily when she is teaching her class at school, telling her that he lied to her. "I can't do just 'casual,'" he says, referencing their commitment earlier to keep things uncommitted. She smiles as they embrace and kiss.

Cast

 Kevin Costner as Senior Chief Aviation Survival Technician Ben Randall
 Ashton Kutcher as Airman / Aviation Survival Technician Third Class Jake Fischer
 Neal McDonough as Chief Aviation Survival Technician Jack Skinner
 Melissa Sagemiller as Emily Thomas
 Leigh Hennessy as Drowning Woman
 Clancy Brown as Captain William Hadley
 Brian Geraghty as Aviation Survival Technician Third Class Billy Hodge
 Sela Ward as Helen Randall
 Omari Hardwick as Chief Petty Officer Carl Billings
 Michael Rady as Zingaro
 Peter Gail as Airman Danny Doran
 Shelby Fenner as Airman Cate Lindsey
 Damon Lipari as Damon Bennett
 Bonnie Bramlett as Maggie McGlone
 John Heard as Captain Frank Larson
 Dulé Hill as Airman Ken Weatherly
 Brian Patrick Wade as Mitch Lyons
 Joe Arquette as Co-Pilot Antunez
 Andrew Schanno as Pilot Henry Mitchell
 Tilky Jones as Tilky Flint
 Jeff Loftus as USCG Commander, Executive Officer 
 Daniel Molthen as Richard Wakefield
 Bryce Cass as Manny
 Chicago Catz as Band In Bar
 Travis Willingham as Travis Finley

Production

David Dobkin was originally slated to direct The Guardian until being replaced by Andrew Davis. Ron Brinkerhoff was also originally involved, making the pitch for a mid-six-figure-budgeted film, before Disney took over the production.

Following the series of hurricanes in the southern United States in 2005, production moved to Shreveport, Louisiana. Some of the base scenes were filmed at Barksdale Air Force Base in Bossier City, Louisiana and at Camp Minden in Minden, Louisiana. Some of the scenes that were supposed to be filmed in Kodiak, Alaska were actually filmed at CG Air Station Elizabeth City, North Carolina. Sixty thousand pounds of ice were needed on the set. The training pool used in the movie was LSU–Shreveport's natatorium.
The wave scenes were filmed at Louisiana Wave Studio, Metropolitan Ave, Lynbrook, Shreveport.

The film was revised after Hurricane Katrina, with the addition of several comments on the storm and the rescues. The end credits are replete with "glory" shots of U.S. Coast Guard helicopters conducting rescues in the greater New Orleans area. The DVD contains a special feature on U.S. Coast Guard rescue operations, especially in the aftermath of Katrina.

Many of the supporting actors in The Guardian, including ASTC instructors, helicopter pilots, and support personnel, are actual U.S. Coast Guard rescue swimmers, pilots, and ground personnel. Several characters, including Kutcher's, identify themselves as airmen. An airman is the enlisted rating of a Coast Guardsman who is undesignated and/or currently undergoing training in an aviation related field. Similar ratings within the Coast Guard are those of seaman and fireman.

One of the students was Mark Gangloff, an Olympic swimmer who received a gold medal in the Athens Olympic Games. The production company hired local contractors to build a massive indoor wave pool for production.

Historical relevance
The mishap in The Guardian where Randall loses his crew is loosely based on an actual U.S. Coast Guard aviation mishap in Alaska. The aircraft was an HH-3F Pelican (USCG variant of the Jolly Green Giant) instead of the HH-60J Jayhawk (USCG variant of the Blackhawk/Seahawk) pictured in the movie.

Alternate ending
In an alternate ending to The Guardian, found on the DVD, Ben survives. As he unhooks and tries to fall, Jake again grabs him and vows not to let go. Instead of unstrapping his glove, Ben lets the cable pull them up and it breaks just as they get into the helicopter. This ending was added because some of the writers were worried that the original ending was too strong for viewers. Nonetheless, it was scrapped when Disney chairman, Dick Cook, applauded the original ending.

Soundtrack

The soundtrack of The Guardian was released by Hollywood Records on September 12, 2006. The soundtrack uses a variety of music genres, including R&B, country music, rock, soul and blues.

Track listing

Reception

Box office
The Guardian earned $18 million on its opening weekend (#2 at the box office behind Open Season), and almost $95 million worldwide by January 4, 2007.

Critical reception
At Rotten Tomatoes, The Guardian received a 37% "Rotten" rating, based on 149 reviews. The site's consensus states: "The Coast Guard gets its chance for a heroic movie tribute, but The Guardian does it no justice, borrowing cliche after cliche from other (and better) military branch movies." While Metacritic rates it a 53/100 based on 29 reviews. Stephen Hunter pans it in The Washington Post, calling it "a good little film" for the first hour then it "begins to overload its frail reed of a structure with giant sloppages of cliches from other movies, some so bad it's almost comical", concluding that the movie "veers off into slobbery touchy-feeliness, and the tone becomes mock-religious, almost liturgical." Wesley Morris of The Boston Globe called it "dutiful but dull." A. O. Scott, in his review for The New York Times, notes that participation by actual members of the Coast Guard "lends an air of authenticity" and concludes "... [i]t's not a great movie, but it's certainly one of the finest Coast Guard pictures you're likely to see anytime soon." In a Variety review, Joe Leydon says the movie is "overlong but [the] involving drama has obvious cross-generational appeal." Ed Blank in the Pittsburgh Tribune-Review gave a mixed review, saying "The Guardian regurgitates formulaic elements in a way that pays off repeatedly and potently."

References

External links

 
 
 
 
 
 The real stories of fatal Coast Guard aviation accidents
 The Guardian full production notes

2006 films
2006 action drama films
2000s action adventure films
American action adventure films
American action drama films
American adventure drama films
American aviation films
Beacon Pictures films
2000s English-language films
Films scored by Trevor Rabin
Films set in Alaska
Films shot in California
Films shot in Louisiana
Films shot in North Carolina
Films directed by Andrew Davis
Films produced by Beau Flynn
Touchstone Pictures films
Films about the United States Coast Guard
United States Coast Guard Aviation
Films set in 2006
2000s American films